The 2018–19 season was Trabzonspor's 51st year in existence. In addition to the domestic league, the club participated in the Turkish Cup.

Süper Lig

League table

Results summary

Results by round

Matches

Türkiye Kupası

Fifth round

Round of 16

Quarter finals

Statistics

Squad statistics

References
 

Trabzonspor seasons
Turkish football clubs 2018–19 season